San Sebastian, officially the Municipality of San Sebastian, is a 6th class municipality in the province of Samar, Philippines. According to the 2020 census, it has a population of 8,704 people.

San Sebastian was absorbed into the town of Wright (Paranas) during the American occupation. In 1950, the neighborhoods of San Sebastian, Jitaasan, Dolores, Camanjagay, Bontod, Campidasa, Campiyak, Maslog, Balogo, Maropangpang, Binongtoan, and Bolwan were combined and re-established as a single town.

History
The town of San Sebastian was known before as "Balugo," (the original and ancient name) considering that it was situated at the mouth of Balugo River. Balugo was a visita and it was annexed to Paranas. It was later renamed San Sebastian by Fray Domingo Ruiz, O.F.M. after his birthplace (a coastal city in Spain) who was then assigned in Balugo. Fr. Ruiz made initial efforts and recommendations that San Sebastian from its status as visita should be elevated and made into pueblo under the spiritual care of the cura paroco of Catbalogan.

Between 1894 and 1895, San Sebastian was given the status as pueblo and an independent parish separated from its mother town, Paranas.
During the outbreak of the Philippine Revolution, San Sebastian was again affixed as a barrio of Paranas. Later with the enactment of Republic Act No. 543 by the Philippine Congress once again San Sebastian became an independent municipality.

Geography

Barangays
San Sebastian is politically subdivided into 14 barangays.
 Poblacion Barangay 1
 Poblacion Barangay 2
 Poblacion Barangay 3
 Poblacion Barangay 4
 Balogo
 Bontod
 Camanhagay
 Campiyak
 Dolores
 Hita-asan I
 Inobongan
 Cabaywa
 Canduyucan
 Hita-asan II

Climate

Demographics

Economy

References

External links
 San Sebastian Profile at PhilAtlas.com
 [ Philippine Standard Geographic Code]
 Philippine Census Information
 Local Governance Performance Management System

Municipalities of Samar (province)